Sally-Ann Spencer is a British translator, specialising in German literature. She studied languages at Cambridge University before going to work in the publishing industry. In 2005, she moved to New Zealand, at the same time choosing literary translation as her full-time profession. She completed a PhD on German literature at the Victoria University of Wellington.

As a translator, Spencer has won the Schlegel-Tieck Prize for her translation of Frank Schätzing's sci-fi novel The Swarm. She now lives in Wellington.

Selected translations
 Juli Zeh: The Method (Corpus Delicti). Harvill Secker, 2012
 Peter Schössow: My First Car was Red (Mein erstes Auto war rot). Gecko Press, 2011
 Markus Heitz: The War of the Dwarves (Der Krieg der Zwerge). Orbit, 2010
 Markus Heitz: The Dwarves (Die Zwerge). Orbit, 2009
 Sebastian Fitzek: Therapy (Die Therapie). Pan Books, 2008
 Frank Schätzing: The Swarm (Der Schwarm). Hodder and Stoughton, 2006

References

Living people
British translators
Victoria University of Wellington alumni
British women writers
Year of birth missing (living people)